The 3rd IAAF World Indoor Championships in Athletics were held at the Palacio Municipal de Deportes San Pablo in Seville, Spain from March 8 to March 10, 1991. It was the first Indoor Championships to include relay races as well as women's triple jump, albeit as a non-championship event. There were a total number of 518 athletes participated from 80 countries.

Results

Men
1987 | 1989 | 1991 | 1993 | 1995

Women
1987 | 1989 | 1991 | 1993 | 1995

Non-championship event

Medal table

Participating nations

 (4)
 (1)
 (2)
 (1)
 (2)
 (12)
 (9)
 (3)
 (3)
 (1)
 (2)
 (1)
 (6)
 (8)
 (2)
 (2)
 (14)
 (3)
 (13)
 (2)
 (2)
 (13)
 (1)
 (16)
 (2)
 (2)
 (2)
 (2)
 (6)
 (17)
 (43)
 (2)
 (21)
 (4)
 (1)
 (7)
 (3)
 (6)
 (2)
 (17)
 (2)
 (10)
 (4)
 (6)
 (1)
 (1)
 (1)
 (1)
 (8)
 (8)
 (1)
 (2)
 (5)
 (5)
 (1)
 (1)
 (2)
 (10)
 (5)
 (2)
 (18)
 (1)
 (3)
 (1)
 (1)
 (42)
 (36)
 (2)
 (5)
 (3)
 (2)
 (5)
 (1)
 (1)
 (1)
 (49)
 (2)
 (2)
 (5)
 (2)

See also
1991 in athletics (track and field)

External links
GBR Athletics
Athletics Australia

 
IAAF World Indoor Championships
Athletics
World Athletics Indoor Championships
Sports competitions in Seville
International athletics competitions hosted by Spain
20th century in Seville
March 1991 sports events in Europe